Adventist University of Goma is a private Christian co-educational school owned and operated by the Seventh-day Adventist Church in the Democratic Republic of Congo. The university is located in Goma, North Kivu, Democratic Republic of Congo.

It is a part of the Seventh-day Adventist education system, the world's second largest Christian school system.

History

Faculties

See also

 List of Seventh-day Adventist colleges and universities
 Seventh-day Adventist education
 Seventh-day Adventist Church
 Seventh-day Adventist theology
 History of the Seventh-day Adventist Church

References 

Universities and colleges affiliated with the Seventh-day Adventist Church
Universities in the Democratic Republic of the Congo